The Amur lemming (Lemmus amurensis) is a species of lemmings found near the Amur River in Siberia.

References

Lemmus
Endemic fauna of Russia
Rodents of Asia
Mammals described in 1924